

This is a list of the National Register of Historic Places listings in West Feliciana Parish, Louisiana.

This is intended to be a complete list of the properties and districts on the National Register of Historic Places in West Feliciana Parish, Louisiana, United States.  The locations of National Register properties and districts for which the latitude and longitude coordinates are included below, may be seen in a map.

There are 32 properties and districts listed on the National Register in the parish, including 1 National Historic Landmark.

Current listings

|}

See also

List of Louisiana state historic sites
List of National Historic Landmarks in Louisiana
National Register of Historic Places listings in East Feliciana Parish, Louisiana

External links
West Feliciana Historical Society Museum
West Feliciana Tourist Commission

References

West Feliciana Parish